FC Tobol Tobolsk is a Russian football team from Tobolsk. Founded in 1999 instead of the dissolved football club "Irtysh".

Football name history in Tobolsk
At different times of the major teams in the city were:
 1939 – «Spartak» Tobolsk
 1963 – «Dinamo» Tobolsk
 1990 – «Stroitel» Tobolsk
 1991 – «Avtomobilist» Tobolsk
 1992 – «Poisk» Tobolsk
 1993–1999 – «Irtysh» Tobolsk
 2000–present – «Tobol» Tobolsk

Team name history
 2000–2004 – «Tobol» Tobolsk
 2005–2008 – «Tobol-Neftekhim» Tobolsk
 2009–present – «Tobol» Tobolsk

External links
  Team statistics at FF

Association football clubs established in 1992
Football clubs in Russia
Sport in Tyumen Oblast
1992 establishments in Russia
Tobolsk